Henry Downes (died 1735) was an eighteenth-century Irish Anglican bishop.

He was nominated Bishop of Killala and Achonry on 24 January 1717 and  consecrated on 12 May that year. In 1720 he was translated to Elphin, being nominated on 1 May and appointed by letters patent on 12 May 1720. In 1724 he was nominated on 17 March to be the Bishop of Derry and appointed by letters patent on 9 April 1724. Finally on 11 January 1727 he was nominated Bishop of Derry  and appointed by letters patent on 8 February 1727. He died in office on 14 January 1735.

References

Bishops of Killala and Achonry
Anglican bishops of Elphin
Anglican bishops of Meath
Anglican bishops of Derry
1735 deaths
Year of birth unknown
18th-century Anglican bishops in Ireland